Dog's Most Wanted is an American reality television series that ran on WGN America from September 4 to November 6, 2019. It succeeds previous reality series starring Duane Chapman, including A&E's Dog the Bounty Hunter, and CMT's Dog and Beth: On the Hunt.

Premise
Rather than hunting down people who have jumped bail with his company, Dog, now mostly retired from bounty hunting, hunts wanted fugitives of his choosing who need his expertise to bring down, while also dealing with his wife's cancer diagnosis.

Cast
 Duane "Dog" Chapman, also known as Dog the Bounty Hunter.
 Beth Chapman, Dog's wife.
 Leland Chapman, Dog's son.
 David Robinson, Dog's Right Hand Man.
Rainy Robinson, Beth's Right Hand Woman.
Cecily Chapman, Beth's Daughter.
Dakota Chapman, Leland's Son.
Sonny Westbrook, Dog's Security.
Kaleo Padilla, Dog's Security.

Episodes

Production
On January 14, 2019, it was announced that WGN America was developing its first unscripted television series in over five years entitled Dog's Most Wanted. The series is produced by Dorsey Pictures, a Red Arrow Studios company, and Entertainment by Bonnie and Clyde. Chris Dorsey and Matt Assmus serve as Executive Producers for Dorsey Pictures while the Chapman's serve as Executive Producers for Entertainment by Bonnie and Clyde. Entertainment by Bonnie and Clyde previously produced other Chapman series Dog and Beth: On the Hunt and Dog and Beth: Fight of Their Lives. The series received an immediate series order for ten episodes and production began in early 2019. In the series Dog and his wife Beth along with their team of hunters are set to travel the country and pursue the most-wanted fugitives from law enforcement agencies including the FBI and the United States Marshals Service. The series was initially expected to premiere in October 2019 however, later reports suggested early 2020. On June 22, 2019, Beth Chapman was hospitalized and placed in a medically induced coma. On June 26, 2019, Beth died at Hawaii's Queen's Medical Center in Honolulu, Hawaii as a result of stage two throat cancer.
Following Beth's death the series resumed filming July 10, 2019. Series star Leland Chapman was injured during filming when he attempted to kick in a gate and tore his ACL while chasing fugitive Edward Morales in Adams County, Colorado. On July 22, 2019, WGN America announced that the series would premiere on September 4, 2019.

Marketing
The first teaser for the series along with series art was released by WGN America on June 3, 2019. A second teaser was released on June 20, 2019. A memorial video commemorative of Beth's death was released on June 26, 2019. A first-look trailer was released on July 22, 2019, along with the announcement of the premiere date. To promote the series, WGN America aired a Dog the Bounty Hunter marathon beginning on September 3, 2019, leading up to the premiere on September 4.

References

2019 American television series debuts
2019 American television series endings
2010s American reality television series
English-language television shows
WGN America original programming
American television spin-offs
Reality television spin-offs